Oxford Mission Epiphany Church, commonly known as Oxford Mission Church, is an Anglican church in Barisal, a southern city in Bangladesh. It is one of the oldest and arguably the second largest church in Asia by land area.

History

In the early 18th century, the ancient river port city Barisal attracted many Christian missionaries. Oxford Mission, an England-based Anglican missionary started its journey in this region from at the end of the 19th century and formed Brotherhood of the Epiphany in 1895. In 1902, a Sisterhood was formed at Barisal under the guidance of Father Strong to work alongside the Brotherhood. The missionary opened an English boarding school, Christian youth hostels, an orphanage, a primary school and a medical centre in its compound at Bogra Road. The work of the sisters was very broad in scope, including evangelism, medical work, educational activity amongst women under the leadership of Edith Langridge. Later a branch house was formed at Jobarpar, Agailjhara thirty miles north of the town.

The Epiphany Church was established in 1903 based on a sketch of Sister Edith and inaugurated on 26 January that year. Father E. L. Strong, chief of the brotherhood had overseen the completion of the church's design, final shape and construction through a second phase in 1907. Frederick Douglass served as the engineer. The church was built on 35 acres of land surrounded by high wall and rows of palm trees.

The church has been preserved as a cultural heritage and survived many natural disasters occurred in the country.

Architecture
The structure of the church reflects Greek architectural style. It appears to be a five-storied building from the outside, it actually has a single floor with a large prayer hall. There are many doors on three sides, 40 archways and numerous corridors around the church. The large cross on the main altar was brought from Bethlehem, Palestine. The interior has been designed with wood carvings and the floor including the baptism bath basin decorated with marble tiles. Another notable attraction of the Oxford Mission Church is the red brick bell tower and the giant bell it houses. The bell is rung seven times every day five minutes before prayers. The bell tower also houses the church's office room.

There are 13 small and large ponds and Oxford Mission High School, hospital, library, students' hostel and living quarters of the father and sisters inside the compound.

Gallery

References

External links
Oxford Mission website

Churches in Bangladesh
Christianity in Bangladesh
1903 establishments in India
Christianity in Barisal